The Looe Valley Line is an  community railway from Liskeard to Looe in Cornwall, United Kingdom, that follows the valley of the East Looe River for much of its course.  It is operated by Great Western Railway.

History
The Looe Valley Line was opened as the Liskeard and Looe Railway on 27 December 1860 from a station at Moorswater, a little west of Liskeard, to the quayside at Looe, replacing the earlier Liskeard and Looe Union Canal. At Moorswater it connected with the Liskeard and Caradon Railway which conveyed granite from quarries on Bodmin Moor.

Passenger services commenced on 11 September 1879, but the Moorswater terminus was inconvenient as it was remote from Liskeard and a long way from the Cornwall Railway station on the south side of the town.  On 15 May 1901 the railway opened a curving link line from Coombe Junction, a little south of Moorswater, to the now Great Western Railway station at Liskeard. The section from Coombe Junction to Moorswater was closed to passenger traffic on the same day but passenger numbers tripled. The new connecting line had to climb a considerable vertical interval to reach the Cornish Main Line which passed above Moorswater on a 147 feet (45m) high viaduct. The Liskeard and Looe Railway was taken over by the Great Western Railway in 1909 and the attractive seaside resort of Looe became heavily promoted as a holiday destination in the railway's publicity.

The section beyond Looe station to the quay was closed in 1916 and the Caradon line north of Moorswater fell out of use at around the same time.

In 1966 the line was due to be closed under Richard Beeching's Reshaping of Britain's Railways plan, but was reprieved just two weeks before its scheduled closure by Minister of Transport Barbara Castle.

Community rail

Since 1992 the Looe Valley Line has been one of the railway lines promoted by the Devon and Cornwall Rail Partnership. Passenger numbers have risen from around 58,000 in 2001 to 118,000 in 2016. 

The line is promoted by many means such as regular timetable and scenic line guides, as well as leaflets highlighting leisure opportunities such as walking, birdwatching, and visiting country pubs.

The Looe Valley Line Rail Ale Trail was launched early in 2004 and encourages rail travellers to visit eight pubs near the line.  Five of these are in Looe, two in Liskeard, and one in Duloe, a 30-minute walk from Causeland station.  Eight stamps collected in the Rail Ale Trail entitle the participant to claim special Looe Valley Line Rail Trail souvenir tour shirt.

The line was designated as a community rail line in September 2005, being one of seven pilots for the Department for Transport's Community Rail Development Strategy.  This aims to establish the true costs and revenues for the line with an aim of improving them.  It is also looking at simplifying the reversal of trains, considering the costs and benefits should the line be "microfranchised" separately from the Great Western Franchise, and the potential for opening a Park and Ride station at Moorswater where the goods sidings are close to the A38 Liskeard Bypass.

In 2007 the signs on the Looe Valley platform at Liskeard were replaced with brown and cream signs in the style used by the Western Region of British Railways in the 1950s and 1960s.

Looe Valley Heritage Project 

In 2019 the Devon and Cornwall Rail Partnership launched a heritage project about the line which told the story of its history through archive information and engaging with the local community. The project won Best Community Engagement Project at the National Community Rail Awards in 2019.

Passenger volume
The majority of Looe Valley passengers travel the whole length of the line with Causeland being the busiest intermediate station. The line has seen some good growth over the years with incremental improvements to the service.

Route

Descending to Coombe
The line is single track for the whole of its length and is worked by just a single train set each day. Trains leave Liskeard railway station from a platform at right angles to the main line platforms, initially running northeast away from Looe.  Beyond the platform the line takes a long right-hand curve, passing the connection through the goods yard to the main line, and diving underneath the A38 road twice.  It then descends steeply, now heading generally southwest, and passes under the Liskeard viaduct carrying the Cornish Main Line 150 feet (46m) above.

Curving right once more, the train joins the main branch line from Looe at Coombe Junction, and comes to a stand on a small level crossing.  Most trains change direction here, the train's guard operating the points (see Signalling below), but two or three in each direction continue a few yards further to call at Coombe Junction Halt at Lamellion.  Beyond the platform the line still continues to Moorswater, passing under the main line again beneath the Moorswater viaduct, but this section is no longer used.

Along the valley
With the driver and guard having now swapped ends, the train recommences its southerly journey, now running alongside the old Liskeard and Looe Union Canal and East Looe River.  Another level crossing is passed at Lodge, and then a short journey brings the train to St Keyne Wishing Well Halt, adjacent to the "Magnificent Music Machines" museum of fairground organs and similar instruments.  The holy well of St Keyne is near the village which is a ten-minute walk from the station.

South of St Keyne the canal swaps to the west side of the line for a while, but as the valley closes in it disappears altogether for a distance where the railway was built on top of the redundant canal.  One of the old canal's locks can be seen at Causeland railway station.  This is the oldest station on the line as it was opened in 1879 when passenger trains first started operating.  In common with most of the stations it has been rebuilt in recent years, a smart brick shelter having replaced the original wooden hut.

Beside the estuary

After passing Sandplace railway station the railway follows the east side of the river, which is now a tidal estuary that the line follows to its terminus. The line passes over one more level crossing, the unusual Terras Crossing, where the road approaches the crossing over a causeway that is liable to flooding at high tide, so the footpath is raised on boards alongside.  As the crossing is ungated trains must come to a stand and sound their horn before crossing.  The ruin of the final lock of the canal is on the east of the line here.

After running further alongside the tidal estuary the line finally arrives at Looe railway station, opposite the point at which the West Looe River flows into the East Looe River to form the tidal Looe harbour.  The town centre is a five-minute walk further alongside the river and buses to Polperro stop on the road near the station.

All distances along the line are measured from the point near the seven-span road bridge across the river where the Liskeard and Looe Railway connected with the private sidings on Buller Quay.  The original station, now the site of the Police Station, was 14 chains (308 yards or 282m) north of this point, but the simple station of 1968 construction is forty yards north of this:  thus the mile post marking ¼ mile from the  original end of the line is in fact opposite the current platform, just 20 yards from the present southern end of the line.

Services

Passenger 

The service operated by Great Western Railway since 10 December 2006 consisted of nine trains each way daily.  During the peak summer period from 20 May to 9 September 2007 three additional services were operated, including a late evening train.  In May 2019 Great Western Railway introduced an improved timetable which saw 15 trains a day run on the line Monday to Saturday and 8 on Sundays from April until October.  

Coombe Junction Halt railway station is served by only two trains each way Mondays to Saturdays. For most of the day, every second train in each direction runs without any intermediate station calls. On the other, stopping, trains, the other intermediate stations are all request stops – this means that passengers alighting must tell the guard that they wish to do so, and those waiting to join must signal clearly to the driver as the train approaches.

The trains are formed of two-car s. 150233 was once named Lady Margret of Looe Valley (the original Lady Margret was a steam locomotive belonging to the Liskeard and Looe Railway). Single-car  153369 was named The Looe Valley Explorer. Both these trains carried large pictures on the outside showing local scenes, but interworked with other similar trains throughout the Great Western Railway network so did not work the line every day. Both these trains have since lost their special liveries and have been repainted in a standard liveries. s are no longer used on this line as GWR no longer operate them.

Freight 

The line previously saw a once-a-week freight service operated by Colas Rail using a Class 70 locomotive. The working was hauled from Aberthaw in Wales to Moorswater, carrying an average of 20 cement containers. In September 2021, this service was stopped, potentially due to lack of demand from the customers. It is uncertain if freight will ever run through to Moorswater again.

Signalling

The line is supervised from the signal box at Liskeard, which also controls the entry and exit from the branch onto the main line.  A complication arises because of the existence of the Coombe to Moorswater freight line, thus the entire branch line is divided into three distinct single track sections controlled by either tokens or wooden staffs.   
 The section from Liskeard to Coombe is operated under the authority of a Tyers No. 9 Electric Token System.  This consists of four electrically interlocked instruments: one in Liskeard signal box, one in a token hut on platform 3 at Liskeard, an intermediate instrument at Coombe No.1 ground frame and an intermediate instrument at Coombe No.2 ground frame.  The instruments are interlinked such that only one token may be withdrawn at any one time.  
 The section from Looe to Coombe is operated under the authority of a wooden staff, which has a key attached that (together with the Liskeard - Coombe key token) unlocks the No. 1 ground frame, allowing the points to be changed to give access to the Looe branch.
 The section from Moorswater to Coombe is operated under the authority of the Shunter at Moorswater.

The train driver is only permitted to enter a section when in possession of the correct staff or token.

The Moorswater section has a fixed "stop board" protecting the station.  Similarly, the Looe section has a stop board before the points at Coombe Junction.  There is no stop board on the Liskeard section because possession of a Liskeard - Coombe token provides an assurance that the points at Coombe No.1 ground frame are normal.  There is a stop board at the end of platform 3 at Liskeard.  The stop boards are fixed signals and a train may not be driven past without authority from the guard operating the ground frame.  TPWS (Train Protection & Warning System) is provided at the stop board at Coombe No.1 ground frame and at platform 3 at Liskeard, suppressed when a token is withdrawn locally for the Liskeard - Coombe section, to protect the single line.

The Liskeard-Coombe Token must, according to the Sectional Appendix, be placed in the intermediate instrument at Coombe No.1 ground frame once a train bound for Looe is clear of the points.  This permits another token to be withdrawn at either Coombe or Liskeard to allow other traffic to use this portion of line whilst the Looe section is occupied.

A goods train will similarly use a Liskeard-Coombe Token, surrendering it to the Shunter who, on this movement, will operate Coombe No.2 ground frame.  A set of trap points, controlled by Coombe No. 2 ground frame, must be opened and then closed again once the train has passed over, after which the Liskeard - Coombe token may be restored to the intermediate instrument.

References

Bibliography
 
 
 Department for Transport Rail Group (2005), Route prospectus for the … Looe Valley Line and … Tamar Valley Line'''
 Devon and Cornwall Rail Partnership (2002), Looe Valley Line Trails from the Track Devon and Cornwall Rail Partnership (2005), Working in Partnership in Devon and Cornwall Devon and Cornwall Rail Partnership (2005), Explore the Beauty of the Tamar Valley and The Looe Valley by Rail Devon and Cornwall Rail Partnership (2007), Spotting Wild Birds by Train''

Further reading

External links

 Devon and Cornwall Rail Ale Trails
 Great Scenic Railways in Devon and Cornwall

Rail transport in Cornwall
Scenic railway lines in Devon and Cornwall
Community railway lines in England
Railway lines opened in 1860
Railway lines in South West England
Standard gauge railways in England
Liskeard
Looe